The second Las Vegas Quicksilvers were a soccer club that competed in the USISL.

Year-by-year

Sports teams in Las Vegas
Defunct soccer clubs in Nevada
Soccer clubs in Nevada
1994 establishments in Nevada
1995 disestablishments in Nevada
Association football clubs established in 1994
Association football clubs disestablished in 1995